This is a list of topics on which environmental organizations focus.

Agriculture 
 Agricultural pollution 
 Agroforestry
 Animal husbandry 
 Aquaculture 
 Biodynamic farming 
 Biotechnology
 Composting 
 Genetically modified foods 
 Herbicides 
 Organic farming 
 Permaculture 
Harmful  substances  in  farming

 Air quality 
 Acid rain 
 Air pollution 
 Asthma 
 Criteria pollutants 
 Fossil fuels 
 Photochemical smog 
 Indoor Air Quality 
 Industrial pollution 
 Ozone depletion 
 Transport and the environment
 Climate change 
 Global warming 
 Greenhouse effect 
 Urban heat island effect
 Ecosystems 
 Coastal ecosystems 
 Coral reefs
 Deserts
 Forests
 Grasslands
 Mountains
 Oceans
 Rainforests
 Rivers, Lakes and Streams
 Wetlands
 Energy  
 Alternative fuels 
 Biomass 
 Energy conservation 
 Efficient energy use 
 Fossil fuel
 Fuel cells
 Geothermal energy 
 Hydroelectric energy 
 Nuclear power 
 Solar energy 
 Wind energy
 Environmental disasters 
 Chemical spills 
 Floods 
 Hurricanes
 Landslides
 Monsoons
 Nuclear and radiation accidents 
 Oil spills 
 Tornadoes
 Wildfires
 Environmental economics 
 Economic development 
 Free trade 
 Globalization
 Environmental education 
 Environmental studies 
 Outdoor Education
 Environmental ethics 
 Deep ecology 
 Ecofeminism 
 Religion and environmentalism 
 Social Ecology
 Environmental legislation and environmental policy 
 Environmental justice 
 Environmental politics 
 Environmental regulation
 Forests 
 Agroforestry 
 Deforestation 
 Forest management 
 Old growth 
 Rainforests 
 Reforestation 
 Sustainable forestry
 Ground pollution 
 Brownfields 
 Industrial pollution 
 Landfills 
 Pollution prevention 
 Resource extraction 
 Soil quality
 Habitat conservation 
 Marine conservation
 National parks
 Pollution 
 Public lands 
 Resource extraction 
 Wilderness areas
 Human health 
 Asbestos 
 Asthma 
 Cancer 
 Chlorine 
 Dioxin 
 Drinking water 
 Fluoride 
 Food quality 
 Genetically modified foods 
 Lead 
 Light pollution 
 Mercury poisoning 
 Multiple chemical sensitivity 
 Noise pollution 
 Occupational safety and health 
 Organochlorines 
 Poverty 
 Radiation 
 Radon 
 Toxins
 Natural history 
 Environmental history 
 Prehistory
 Oceans 
 Aquaculture 
 Beaches 
 Coastal ecosystems 
 Coral Reefs 
 Fisheries 
 Marine biology 
 Oceanography
 Outdoor recreation 
 Biking 
 Bird watching 
 Hiking/Backpacking 
 Snowsports/Ice sports 
 Water sports
 Population 
 Overconsumption 
 Overpopulation
 Sciences 
 Atmospheric sciences 
 Biology 
 Biotechnology 
 Botany 
 Chemistry 
 Ecology 
 Geography 
 Geology 
 Meteorology 
 Oceanography 
 Ornithology 
 Paleontology
 Social sciences and humanities 
 Archaeology 
 Ethnic diversity 
 Indigenous cultures 
 World cultures
 Sustainable business 
 Alternative fuels 
 Corporate accountability 
 Economic development 
 Ecotourism 
 Energy conservation 
 Green building 
 Social investing 
 Sustainable technology 
 Waste reduction 
 Water conservation
 Sustainable development 
 Economic development 
 Sustainable agriculture 
 Sustainable forestry 
 Sustainable technology
 Sustainable living 
 Consumerism 
 Green building 
 Home maintenance 
 Organic gardening 
 Social investing 
 Sustainable transport
 Transportation 
 Alternative fuel vehicles 
 Bicycles 
 Mass transit 
 Remote work
 Urban issues 
 Light pollution 
 Noise pollution 
 Sprawl 
 Traffic 
 Urban heat island effect 
 Urban planning
 Vegetarianism 
 Fruitarianism 
 Veganism 
 Vegetarianism 
 Lacto vegetarianism
 Waste management 
 Bioremediation 
 Composting 
 Environmental remediation 
 Hazardous and toxic waste 
 Landfills 
 Nuclear Waste 
 Recycling
 Water quality 
 Beaches 
 Drinking water 
 Fishing 
 Industrial pollution 
 Water conservation 
 Water pollution 
 Water treatment 
 Watersheds
 Wildlife 
 Biodiversity 
 Conservation biology 
 Endangered species 
 Fauna 
 Flora 
 Invasive species 
 Native plants 
 Wildflowers 
 Wildlife conservation 
 Wildlife sanctuaries

See also

List of conservation issues
List of environmental issues
List of environmental organizations

Organisations
topics
Environmental organisation